Chatamla is a monotypic moth genus in the family Epicopeiidae described by Frederic Moore in 1881. Its only species, Chatamla flavescens, was described by Francis Walker in 1854. It is found in northern India.

References

Moths described in 1854
Epicopeiidae
Monotypic moth genera